{{DISPLAYTITLE:C8H12O3}}
The molecular formula C8H12O3 (molar mass: 156.18 g/mol) may refer to:

 3,4-Epoxycyclohexanecarboxylate methyl ester
 3,3,4,4-Tetramethyltetrahydrofuran-2,5-dione

Molecular formulas